Devin may refer to:

Places
Devin, Bulgaria, a town
Devin, Minab, a village in Hormozgan Province, Iran
Devin, North Khorasan, a village in North Khorasan Province, Iran
Devin, Razavi Khorasan, a village in Razavi Khorasan Province, Iran
Devin, the Slovene name of Duino in Italy
Devín, a borough of Bratislava, Slovakia
Devín Castle
Děvín, a mountain in the Czech Republic
Devín Gate, a natural gate in the Danube valley at the border of Slovakia and Austria
Camp Devin, Montana, a temporary United States Army camp established in 1878

People
Devin (name), a list of people with the given name or surname
Devin the Dude (born 1970), American hip hop artist Devin Copeland

Other uses
Devin Enterprises, an American manufacturer of cars and kit-cars

See also
Devins (disambiguation)
Devon (disambiguation)